Antichrist Demoncore is the first full-length studio album by American grindcore band AC×DC, released in June 2014 through Melotov Records.

Track listing
 "Destroy//Create" – 1:04
 "Misled" – 0:51
 "Paid in Full" – 1:28
 "Vegangelical" – 1:11
 "Holmes" – 0:35
 "Overstimulated" – 1:17
 "Cheap Punks" – 0:41
 "Hipler Youth" – 1:03
 "Savior Complexxx" – 0:47
 "Endless Failure" – 1:52
 "Blood" – 0:54
 "Dead Cops" – 1:04
 "Keep Sweet" – 1:08
 "Lifeless" – 0:36
 "Filicide" – 1:55
 "Give Up" – 3:37

References

2014 albums
AC×DC albums